Adams was an automobile introduced manufactured by the Adams Manufacturing Co. Ltd. from 1903 to 1906. It was developed by H. Adams, of Tunbridge Wells, Kent, England, who offered a conversion set that converted horse-drawn carriages into motorized automobiles. The engine was mounted on a swivelling fore-carriage, and steering was achieved through wheel and vertical column. In 1905, Adams produced a small 2-cylinder car sold under the name 'One of the Best'.

References

Georgano, G.N., "Adams", in G.N. Georgano, ed., The Complete Encyclopedia of Motorcars 1885-1968  (New York: E.P. Dutton and Co., 1974), pp. 27.

Defunct motor vehicle manufacturers of England
Royal Tunbridge Wells